Shoshana E. Bean (born September 1, 1977) is an American singer, songwriter, YouTuber, and stage actress. She has released three records and has appeared on many theater cast recordings and film soundtracks. In 2022, Bean received a nomination for the Tony Award for Best Featured Actress in a Musical for her performance as Susan Young in Mr. Saturday Night.

Early life and education
Bean was born in Olympia, Washington to Jeff Bean and Felice Moskowitz, a dance teacher. Bean is Jewish and is an only child. When she was 9 years old, her parents divorced and she moved to the Portland, Oregon area.

In 1995, Bean graduated from Beaverton High School. In 1999, Bean received a B.F.A. in Musical Theatre from the University of Cincinnati College-Conservatory of Music (CCM).

Career

Theatre 
Shortly after moving to New York City in 2000, Bean was cast in the 2000 Off-Broadway revival of Godspell at the York Theatre at Saint Peter's Church in Midtown Manhattan.

In 2001, Bean performed in the national tour of Leader of the Pack.

In 2002, Bean made her Broadway debut as an original cast member in the role of Shelley, Denizen of Baltimore, which she originated, in the Tony Award-winning production of Hairspray. She was also an understudy for the roles of Tracy Turnblad, Velma Von Tussle, and Prudy Pingleton.

In 2004, Bean joined the Broadway production of the smash-hit musical Wicked as a replacement standby for Elphaba, which was played by Idina Menzel. On January 8, 2005, a day before Menzel's scheduled end of her run as Elphaba, Menzel fell through a trap door and cracked a lower rib. Bean went on to perform that show. On January 11, 2005, Bean took over as Elphaba full-time, where she performed opposite Jennifer Laura Thompson and then Megan Hilty as Glinda, until her last show on January 8, 2006. On January 10, she was replaced by Eden Espinosa as Elphaba.

In 2006, Bean reprised the role of Elphaba in the first national tour of Wicked. Her limited engagement ended on December 31. In 2009, Bean joined the new production of Peepshow in Las Vegas in the role of Peep Diva alongside Holly Madison. She replaced Spice Girls singer, Mel B.

In 2011, Bean wrote and starred in the musical Dear John Mayer, with music and lyrics by Bean and book by fellow CCM graduate Eydie Faye.

In 2015, Bean portrayed the role of CeeCee Bloom in the musical adaptation of the book and movie Beaches at the Drury Lane Theater in Chicago. In 2017, Bean played Fanny Brice in North Shore Music Theatre's production of Funny Girl. In 2018, Bean performed in the New York City Center Encores! production of Songs for a New World.

On March 18, 2019, Bean returned to Broadway in the role of Jenna in the production of Waitress for a limited engagement through May 2019. On May 13, 2019, it was announced that Bean's run was extended through July 21, 2019.

Starting in March 2022, she returned to Broadway in Mr. Saturday Night  at the Nederlander Theatre starring Billy Crystal. For her performance, she received nominations for the Distinguished Performer Award at the Drama League Awards, Outstanding Featured Actress in a Musical at the 71st Outer Critics Circle Awards,  and the Tony Award for Best Featured Actress in a Musical at the 75th Tony Awards.

Singer 
On December 2, 2008, Bean released her debut solo album, Superhero, on her own label Shotime Records. The record has been described as pop rock.

In February 2013, Bean's second album, O'Farrell Street, was released. It was produced by Tim K (Madonna, Celine Dion, Brandy), and incorporates 1960s-era soul. The record reached No. 3 on the iTunes R&B charts.

In December 2014, Bean released an EP album of blues called Shadows to Light. The record was produced by Bean and Jake Schaefer. It reached No. 1 on the iTunes Blues charts. She performed her single "Runaway Train" on The Queen Latifah Show.

Beginning in 2015, Bean has performed with Scott Bradlee's Postmodern Jukebox (PMJ), performing Justin Bieber's "Sorry" and Backstreet Boys' “I Want It That Way,” among others. In the spring of 2016, she joined the PMJ European Tour.

In February 2018, Bean's third album, Spectrum, was released. The songs are in the genre of rhythm and blues. The record release was accompanied by a tour, which included concerts at the Apollo Theater in Harlem, which featured an 18-piece orchestra, as well as a string of other dates including in London at Cadogan Hall, Las Vegas and Dallas. Bean has said that inspirations for the record were the music of Aretha Franklin, Barbra Streisand, and Frank Sinatra.

In August and September 2019, Bean performed selected songs at a series of residency concerts at Feinstein's/54 Below.

Bean's music has been featured on MTV's The Hills, Mercy, Girlfriends' Guide to Divorce, Bad Girls Club and Showtime's The Big C, and she arranged the vocals for Jennifer Lopez's performance of her 2014 song "I Luh Ya Papi" on American Idol.

Bean has appeared on film soundtracks to Hairspray, Enchanted, the Wayans Brothers' Dance Flick, and the 2016 animated musical Sing.

Bean has performed around the world in cabarets and concerts. She has sung with artists such as Bebe Winans, Brian McKnight, Ariana Grande, David Foster, and Jason Robert Brown, Michael Jackson, among others.

Theatre

Benefits

Discography

LPs
 2008: Superhero (Shotime Records)
 2013: O' Farrell Street (Shotime Records)
 2018: Spectrum (Shotime Records)

EPs 
 2014: Shadows to Light - EP (Shotime Records)
 2020: Selah - EP

Singles 
 2011: "A Little Hope" (Billy-Boo)
 2012: "O Holy Night" (Shotime Records)
 2012: "Runnin' Out Of Days" (Shotime Records)
 2013: "Skywriter" (Shotime Records)
 2014: "Runaway Train" (Shotime Records)
 2015: "Jealous" (Shotime Records) – cover of the Labrinth song
 2015: "Have Yourself a Merry Little Christmas" (Shotime Records)
 2017: "One Way to Go" (Shotime Records) – written by Bean and Britten Newbill.

Soundtracks and cast recordings 
 2001: Godspell – Off-Broadway Revival Cast Recording (Varese Sarabande)
 2002: Hairspray – Original Broadway Cast Recording (Sony Classical)
 2007: Hairspray – Original Motion Picture Soundtrack (New Line Records)
 2008: Enchanted – Original Motion Picture Soundtrack (Walt Disney Records)
 2015: Are You Joking?, "Ain't Life Funny" – Original Motion Picture Soundtrack (Barb & Associates Records)
 2018: Songs for a New World -  2018 New York City Center Encores! Cast Recording

Selected other recordings 
 2003: "Dreidel, Dreidel, Dreidel" on Broadway's Greatest Gifts: Carols for a Cure
 2005: "I Believe in Love" from Hair for Actor's Fund Benefit Recording 
 2007: "Home" on Dreaming Wide Awake: The Music of Scott Alan
 2008: "House of Love" on 37 Notebooks by Jeremy Schonfeld
 2008: "Could" on Matt Cusson by Matt Cusson
 2009: "Tiny Urban Zoo" on School House Rock:Earth
 2011: "Sing Me a Happy Song" on My Lifelong Love by Georgia Stitt
 2012: "Stand Up" on Anthem to benefit St. Jude
 2013: "Monster" on Alphabet Radio by The Edge Effect
 2014: "I'm in Pain" on Anything Worth Holding On To by Scott Alan
 2015: "I Want It That Way" on Selfies on Kodachrome by Postmodern Jukebox
 2015: "Poison" on Emoji Antique by Postmodern Jukebox
 2016: "Sorry" on PMJ and Chill by Postmodern Jukebox
 2016: "Stone Cold" on Swing the Vote by Postmodern Jukebox
 2017: "I Did Something Bad" by Taylor Swift with Cynthia Erivo
 2017: "Goodbye to You" on Only Human by Matt Cusson
 2017: "Flying Monkey Lament" on Straight Outta Oz by Todrick Hall
 2017: "Who Would Imagine a King" on Christmas Sessions EP by Matt Bloyd
 2017: "Baby It's Cold Outside" on Warm Up EP by VoicePlay
 2018: "This is Me" from The Greatest Showman: Original Motion Picture Soundtrack
 2018: "Crashed N' Burned" on Paint Me Back by Patric Scott
 2021: "Kailangan Ko'y Ikaw"  on Giliw: A Troy Laureta OPM Collective Vol. 2 by Troy Laureta

Filmography 
 2009: The Battery's Down (TV Series) as Dr. Mary Jane Essajay in 1 episode: "I Think I'm Gonna Like it Here"
 2009: The Girls Next Door (TV Series) as Peep Diva in 1 episode: "Look Before You Peep"
 2009: Schoolhouse Rock! (TV Series short) vocals in 1 episode: "A Tiny Urban Zoo"
 2017: Bloodline (TV Series) as Shayna in 1 episode: "Part 30"
 2020: Bill & Ted Face the Music as First Noble

Awards and honors 
 2010: Independent Music Award, Best R&B Song for "Superhero" from Superhero
 2015: Jeff Award, Best Lead Actress in a Musical, nominee, for her role as CeeCee Bloom in the musical Beaches at Drury Lane Theater, Chicago
 2017: IRNE Award for her role as Fanny Brice in the musical Funny Girl at North Shore Music Theatre, Beverly, Massachusetts

References

Further reading

External links

 
 
 

1977 births
American musical theatre actresses
American stage actresses
University of Cincinnati – College-Conservatory of Music alumni
American women singer-songwriters
Living people
People from Beaverton, Oregon
Independent Music Awards winners
Jewish American actresses
Jewish American songwriters
Jewish women singers
American LGBT rights activists
Singer-songwriters from Oregon
Beaverton High School alumni
21st-century American Jews
21st-century American women